Páll is a name primarily of Icelandic  and Faroese origins. Notable people with the name include:

 Páll Bálkason (died 1231), Hebridean lord who was an ally of Olaf the Black
 Páll Gíslason (1924–2004), Icelandic medical practitioner and scout
 Páll Guðlaugsson (born 1958), Icelandic football player and coach
 Páll Guðmundsson (born 1959), Icelandic sculptor and artist
 Páll Mohr Joensen (born 1986), Faroese footballer
 Páll Jónsson (1155–1211), Icelandic Roman Catholic clergyman
 Páll Klettskarð (born 1990), Faroese football striker
 Páll Magnússon (born 1954), Icelandic television director
 Páll Melsteð (disambiguation), multiple people, including:
Páll Melsteð (amtmann) (1791–1861), Icelandic official and politician
Páll Melsteð (historian) (1812–1910), Icelandic historian
 Páll Ólafsson (disambiguation), multiple people, including:
Páll Ólafsson (handballer) (born 1960), Icelandic Olympic handballer
Páll Ólafsson (poet) (1827–1905), Icelandic poet
 Páll Bragi Pétursson  (born 1937), Icelandic politician
 Páll á Reynatúgvu (born 1967), Faroese politician and footballer
 Páll Ragnar Pálsson (born 1977), Icelandic composer and member of Icelandic rock band Maus
 Páll Skúlason (1945–2015), Icelandic professor of philosophy and Rector of the University of Iceland

Surname
 Nólsoyar Páll (1766–c.1808), Faroese national hero
 Sándor Páll (1954–2010), ethnic Hungarian politician in Serbia

See also
 Pall (name)
 Paul (name)

Icelandic masculine given names
Faroese masculine given names